This is a list of the candidates that ran for the Christian Heritage Party of Canada in the 41st Canadian federal election.

Alberta

In addition, CHP party member Larry Heather, a candidate in previous elections, ran as an independent in Calgary Southwest, referencing the CHP policies and website on his election campaign website.  He received 303 votes, 0.53% of the votes, placing 5th of 5 candidates.

British Columbia

Manitoba

New Brunswick

Nova Scotia

Ontario

Prince Edward Island

Quebec

See also
Results of the Canadian federal election, 2011
Christian Heritage Party of Canada candidates, 2008 Canadian federal election

References

Candidates in the 2011 Canadian federal election
2011